Willem Jan Otten (born 4 October 1951) is a Dutch prose writer, playwright and poet, who in 2014 won the P. C. Hooft Award for lifetime literary achievement.

Biography
Otten was born in Amsterdam as the son of the musicians Marijke Ferguson and Kees Otten. He spent his youth in the Rivierenbuurt in Amsterdam and in Laren.

He grew up in an atmosphere of moral libertinism. His nonfiction is in part a reflection upon that atmosphere and a polemic with the philosophy behind that atmosphere. He published his first book of poetry in 1973. He has published essays and fiction about euthanasia and played a role in the euthanasia debate in the Netherlands by criticizing the arguments in favour of euthanasia and the freedom of choice in matters of one's own life and death.

In 1999 he published an essay Het wonder van de losse olifanten, een rede tot de ontwikkelden onder de verachters van de christelijke religie ("The miracle of the solitary elephants. Lecture addressed to the cultivated among the despisers of the Christian religion") in which he examined the arguments pro and contra Christian belief. This lecture followed upon his conversion to Roman Catholicism.

Some of his books are translated in Italian, German, French and Swedish. He won the 2005 Libris Prize for Specht en zoon. Otten is married to writer Vonne van der Meer.

Awards 
 1972 - Reina Prinsen Geerligsprijs - Een zwaluw vol zaagsel
 1981 - Herman Gorterprijs -Ik zoek het hier
 1992 - Jan Campertprijs - Paviljoenen
 1994 - Busken Huetprijs - De letterpiloot
 1999 - Constantijn Huygens Prize - collected works
 2005 - Libris Literatuur Prijs - Specht en zoon
 2007 - Honorary degree in theology from Utrecht University.
 2014 - P. C. Hooft Award

Bibliography 
 Een zwaluw vol zaagsel, 1973 (poetry)
 Het keurslijf, 1974 (poetry)
 De eend. Een epyllion, 1975 (poetry)
 Het ruim, 1976 (poetry)
 Henry II, 1978 (toneelstuk)
 Ik zoek het hier, 1980 (poetry)
 Een sneeuw, 1983 (play)
 Een man van horen zeggen, 1984 (novel)
 Denken is een lust, 1985 (essay)
 Lichaam & blik, 1986 (play)
 Na de nachttrein, 1988 (poetry)
 Boek en film, 1989 (essay)
 Het museum van licht, 1991 (essays about film)
 Paviljoenen, 1991 -  (poetry)
 De wijde blik, 1992 (novel)
 De letterpiloot, 1994 -  (essays)
 Ons mankeert niets, 1994 -  (novel)
 De fuik van Pascal, 1997 (essay)
 De nacht van de pauw, 1997 (play)
 Eindaugustuswind, 1998 (poetry)
 Het wonder van de losse olifanten, 1999 (essay)
 Oude mensen, 1999 (play)
 Eerdere gedichten, 2000 (poetry)
 Op de hoge, 2003 (poetry)
 Braambos, 2004 (play)
 Specht en zoon, 2004 (novel)
 Een sneeuw en meer toneel, 2006 (play)
 Alexander, 2006 (play)
 Waarom komt u ons hinderen, 2006 (essays)
 Welkom, 2008 (poetry)
 De bedoeling van verbeelding. Zomerdagboek, gevolgd door zes gedichten, 2008 (diary, poetry)
 Onze Lieve Vrouwe van de Schemering. Essays over poëzie, film en geloof, 2009 (essays)
 De genadeklap, 2017 (poetry)

References

External links 
 
 Willem Jan Otten in the Digital Library of Dutch Literature (DBNL)

1951 births
Living people
20th-century Dutch novelists
20th-century Dutch male writers
21st-century Dutch novelists
Dutch male poets
Libris Prize winners
Writers from Amsterdam
Constantijn Huygens Prize winners
Dutch male novelists
Dutch male dramatists and playwrights
21st-century Dutch male writers
20th-century Dutch dramatists and playwrights
21st-century Dutch dramatists and playwrights